The 1975 Louisville Cardinals football team was an American football team that represented the University of Louisville as an independent during the 1975 NCAA Division I football season. In their first season under head coach Vince Gibson, the Cardinals compiled a 1–10 record and were outscored by a total of 316 to 148.

The team's statistical leaders included John Darling with 946 passing yards, Walter Peacock with 1,013 rushing yards and 36 points scored, and Tony Smith with 382 receiving yards.

Schedule

Roster

References

Louisville
Louisville Cardinals football seasons
Louisville Cardinals football